Loricidae is a family of molluscs belonging to the order Chitonida.

Genera:
 Lorica Adams & Adams, 1852
 Loricella Pilsbry, 1893

References

Chitons